Macropeplus is a genus of flowering plants belonging to the family Monimiaceae.

Its native range is Brazil.

Species
Species:

Macropeplus dentatus 
Macropeplus friburgensis 
Macropeplus ligustrinus 
Macropeplus schwackeanus

References

Monimiaceae
Monimiaceae genera